Several Shades of Jade is a 1963 album by Cal Tjader arranged by Lalo Schifrin.
It peaked at 79 on the Billboard 200.

Reception

Stewart Mason reviewed the album for Allmusic and wrote that of Tjader and Schifrin's collaboration that it was "...no more traditional Asian music than Tjader's similar albums from this period are traditional Latin American music, but the pair wisely avoids the standard clichés of Asian music (no smashing gongs after every musical phrase or melodies that sound like rejects from The Mikado). Instead, Schifrin frames Tjader's meditative vibraphone solos in arrangements that strike a cool balance between western kitsch and eastern exotica, never tipping too far in either direction. ...Several Shades of Jade is actually an interesting experiment that succeeds more often than it fails."

Track listing 
 "The Fakir" (Lalo Schifrin)
 "Cherry Blossom" (Ronnell Bright)
 "Borneo" (Schifrin)
 "Tokyo Blues" (Horace Silver)
 "Song of the Yellow River" (Schifrin)
 "Sahib" (Stan Applebaum)
 "China Nights (Shina No Yoru)" (Yaso Saijo, Nobuyki Takeoka)
 "Almond Tree" (Schifrin)
 "Hot Sake" (Quincy Jones)

Personnel 
Cal Tjader – vibraphone
Lalo Schifrin – arranger, piano (track 3)
George Duvivier - bass
George Berg - bass clarinet, bassoon
Charles McCracken - cello (tracks 1, 2)
Jack Del Rio - congas, tambourine
Ed Shaughnessy - drums
Walt Levinsky - flute, woodwind
Robert Northern - French horn (tracks 3-9)
Jim Raney - guitar
Robert Maxwell - harp
Irving Horowitz, Leon Cohen - oboe
Johnny Rae - timbales, percussion
Urbie Green - trombone (tracks 3-9)
Clark Terry, Ernie Royal - trumpet (tracks 3-9)
Don Butterfield - tuba
Arnold Eidus, Emanuel Vardi, Leo Kruczek - violin (tracks 1, 2)
Phil Bodner, Stan Webb - woodwinds
Phil Kraus - xylophone (miscredited as a woodwind player on CD reissue)
Production
John Murello – cover design
Irv Bahrt - cover photo
Chuck Stewart - liner photography
Bob Simpson – engineer
Val Valentin – director of engineering
Jack Maher – liner notes
Creed Taylor – producer

References

1963 albums
Albums arranged by Lalo Schifrin
Cal Tjader albums
Verve Records albums